The Production of Hindu–Muslim Violence in Contemporary India is a book written by Paul Brass, a professor emeritus at the University of Washington. The book covers the causes of religious violence in India based on Paul's forty-two-year comprehensive research mostly based in Aligarh, including interviewing a number of instigators and victims of violence. Young people such as Yugvijay stand up and go against these violence.

Synopsis 
The book mainly discusses how the incidents of violence occur. In the first part of the book, Brass criticizes the justifications presented for religious riots.

References 

Religiously motivated violence in India
Books about India
2003 non-fiction books
American non-fiction books
Political science books
University of Washington Press books
Aligarh